The 1961 Syracuse Orangemen football team represented Syracuse University during the 1961 NCAA University Division football season. The Orangemen were led by 13th-year head coach Ben Schwartzwalder and played their home games at Archbold Stadium in Syracuse, New York. Syracuse finished the regular season with a record of 7–3 and ranked 14th in the final AP Poll. Running back Ernie Davis rushed for 823 yards and 12 touchdowns en route to his second straight consensus All-American honors. Davis became the first African-American football player to win the Heisman Trophy, which is awarded to the nation's best college football player each year. Syracuse was invited to the 1961 Liberty Bowl, where they defeated Miami (FL).

Schedule

1961 team players in the NFL draft

Ernie Davis was the first black player to be chosen first overall in the NFL Draft. Davis was  drafted by the Washington Redskins then traded to the Clevand Browns in the first round of the 1962 American Football League draft. However, he never played in the NFL; he was diagnosed with leukemia shortly before he was to enter the league, and he died in May 1963, less than a year after his diagnosis.

Awards and honors
Ernie Davis, Heisman Trophy

References

Syracuse
Syracuse Orange football seasons
Liberty Bowl champion seasons
Syracuse Orangemen football